Syarikat Takaful Malaysia Keluarga Berhad (Takaful Malaysia or Takaful Malaysia Keluarga) is the FIRST takaful operator in Malaysia. Takaful Malaysia Keluarga is the holding company that manages the Family Takaful business and owns 100% equity of Syarikat Takaful Malaysia Am Berhad (Takaful Malaysia Am), which operates the General Takaful business. Providing a comprehensive and affordable range of family takaful and general takaful solutions, both companies operate under the Takaful Malaysia brand with a combined network of branches in 24 locations nationwide. In addition, Takaful Malaysia has two subsidiary companies in Indonesia, PT Asuransi Takaful Keluarga and PT Syarikat Takaful Indonesia.

History

 Takaful Malaysia was established on 29 November 1984 when the Government of Malaysia set up a task force to study the feasibility of establishing an Islamic insurance company in Malaysia.
 The incorporation of Takaful Malaysia as the first takaful operator in the country was in the same year as the Takaful Act was enacted.

 Takaful Malaysia commenced its operations on 22 July 1985. 

 Takaful Malaysia was converted into a public limited company on 19 October 1995, followed by its listing on the Main Board (now known as ‘Main Market’) of Bursa Malaysia Securities Berhad on 30 July 1996.
 In accordance with the Islamic Financial Services Act 2013 (“IFSA”), Takaful Malaysia separated its composite license into two licensed entities on 1 June 2018.
 The current substantial shareholders of Takaful Malaysia are Lembaga Tabung Haji, Employees Provident Fund Board and Kumpulan Wang Persaraan (Diperbadankan), with a shareholding of 28.20%, 12.54% and 6.88%, respectively, as at 30 December 2022.

Awards 

 Graduates’ Choice of Employer to Work For in 2022 - Graduates’ Choice Award
 HR Asia Best Companies to Work For in Asia 2022 (Malaysia Edition)
 Highest Growth in Profit After Tax Over Three Years (Financial Services Sector) - The Edge Billion Ringgit Club Corporate Awards 2022
 Most Outstanding Company in Malaysia (Insurance Sector Category) - Asiamoney Asia's Outstanding Companies Poll 2022
 iBanding.com Best Motor Takaful Company in Malaysia 2021/2022
 HR Asia Best Companies to Work For in Asia 2021 (Malaysia Edition)
 Most Attractive Graduate Employers to Work For in 2022 (Insurance Category) - Graduate's Choice Awards 2021/2022
 Highest Returns to Shareholders Over Three Years Award (Financial Services Sector) - The Edge Billion Ringgit Club Corporate Awards 2020
 Highest Return on Equity Over Three Years Award (Financial Services Sector) - The Edge Billion Ringgit Club Corporate Awards 2020
 Highest Return on Equity Over Three Years Award (Financial Services Sector) - The Edge Billion Ringgit Club Corporate Awards 2019
 Highest Growth in Profit After Tax Over Three Years Award (Financial Services Sector) - The Edge Billion Ringgit Club Corporate Awards 2019
 The Malaysian Takaful Association's Innovation Award (Special Awards Category) - Takaful StarNite Awards 2019
 The Malaysian Takaful Association's Race For Cover Award - Takaful StarNite Awards 2019
 Highest Return on Equity Over Three Years (Financial Services Sector) - Runner-up - The Edge Billion Ringgit Club Corporate Awards 2018 
 Highest Growth in Profit After Tax Over Three Years (Financial Services Sector) - Runner-up - The Edge Billion Ringgit Club Corporate Awards 2018
 Top Three Best Employer Brand (Insurance Category) - Graduates’ Choice Awards 2018
 National ICT Association of Malaysia (PIKOM) - Project Leadership Certification (PLC) Annual Leadership Award 2018 
 iBanding.com Best Motor Takaful Company in Malaysia 2017/2018

References

Takaful companies of Malaysia
Malaysian brands
Companies based in Kuala Lumpur
Financial services
Companies listed on Bursa Malaysia
Banks of Malaysia
Takaful companies